Cynthia Grant, Ph.D., is a former Canadian federal scientist who is internationally recognized as an expert in soil fertility and crop nutrition. A researcher with Agriculture and Agri-Food Canada (AAFC) (1986-2015), she is highly respected by industry, farmers, and public agencies alike. Her research provided the scientific foundation for the Made-in-Canada 4R nutrient stewardship framework that applies crop nutrients from the right source and at the right rate, time and place. Grant is now part of an elite group of ten women who have been inducted into the Canadian Agricultural Hall of Fame since 1960.

Biography 
Grant grew up on a farm near Minnedosa in southwestern Manitoba. As a youth she showed interest in agriculture and was actively involved in her 4-H beef club.

Grant completed her B.S.A. (1980), M.Sc. (1982) and Ph.D. (1986) at the University of Manitoba. Her academic excellence was recognized with the University of Manitoba Gold Medal for highest standing in the B.Sc. Agriculture program, the AIfred Rea Tucker Scholarship for highest standing among students entering the faculty of graduate studies at the University of Manitoba, an NSERC Graduate Scholarship, and a Potash and Phosphate Institute Fellowship. She was the first woman Ph.D. graduate from the Department of Soil Science at University of Manitoba.

Career 
Grant worked as a research scientist at AAFC's Brandon Research and Development Centre from 1986 to 2015. Her research investigated nutrient management for sustainable cropping in the prairies and developing practices to increase nutrients and protein concentration and reduce cadmium in crops.

Grant's research includes cadmium-phosphorus work with Fertilizer Canada and a Phosphorus Fertilization Review recently completed in partnership with the University of Manitoba. Grant also worked to develop and assess beneficial management practices (BMPs) for nitrogen, phosphorus, potassium, sulphur and chloride to improve nutrient use efficiency, becoming one of the first Canadian researchers supported by the international Fluid Fertilizer Foundation.

She has prepared dozens of technology transfer articles and presentations in North America, South America, Australia, Europe, and Asia on the usefulness of Enhanced Efficiency Fertilizers (EEFs) and 4R nutrient management practices in cropping systems. Grant has published over 180 journal articles on nutrient management with topics ranging from diversified cropping systems, crop nutrition, nutrient dynamics in tillage systems to trace element behaviour in soils and crops.

As of July 2019, Grant was the lead author of three of the ten most highly cited scientific papers in the Canadian Journal of Plant Science. In addition, she has co-authored chapters on soil fertility management in dryland agriculture and sulphur management and co-edited a book on Integrated Nutrient Management, given hundreds of extension presentations and written over 200 extension bulletins and reports for the benefit of agronomists, farmers and policy-makers.

Her accomplishments have not only earned her significant respect and support from colleagues, managers, and peers, but also have led to national and international demands for her expertise and contributions to various agricultural, environmental, and health issues.

Grant also served as an adjunct professor in the Department of Soil Science at the University of Manitoba. Grant has worked with the university as a research project leader, student supervisor or advisor, adjunct professor, mentor, co-investigator and co-author. She also served as Associate Editor of the Journal of Environmental Quality, Canadian Journal of Soil Science, and  Canadian Journal of Plant Science. As of 2019, she was the only person to have served as president of both theCanadian Society of Agronomy and the  Canadian Society of Soil Science.

Grant's research is depicted in the poster gallery created by Ingenium Canada's The Women in STEM initiative. This poster gallery is a collaborative effort between the three Ingenium museums: Canada Agriculture and Food, Canada Aviation and Space, and Canada Science and Technology and their partners to support the engagement, advancement and furtherance of women in STEM.

Honours and awards 

 International Fertilizer Industry Association Award for Young Professionals
The Robert E. Wagner Award, Potash and Phosphate Institute (1997–98)
 Researcher of the Year, Fluid Fertilizer Foundation Award (2000) 
 Non-Farmer of the Year Award, Manitoba-North Dakota Zero Tillage Farmers Association (2007) 
 Young Agronomists Award, Canadian Society of Agronomy (2001) 
 President, Canadian Society of Agronomy (1999-2001)
 Fellow, Canadian Society of Agronomy (2004)
 President of the Canadian Society of Soil Science (2010)
 Fellow, American Society of Agronomy (2010) 
 Fellow, Canadian Society of Soil Science (2011)
 Gold Harvest Award, Agriculture and Agri-Food Canada for outstanding science achievement (2011)
 Associate Editor of the Journal of Environmental Quality (2009-2011)
 Certificate of Merit, Faculty of Agricultural and Food Sciences, University of Manitoba - in recognition of leadership with agricultural organizations and outstanding service to the community at large (2015)
 Distinguished Agronomist Award, Canadian Society of Agronomy (2015)
 Innovative Technologies Advancing the Fertilizer Industry Award, Fertilizer Industry Round Table (2015)
 Canola Award of Excellence, Manitoba Canola Growers Association (2019)
Leo M. Walsh Soil Fertility Distinguished Lectureship (2019) 
 Canadian Agricultural Hall of Fame (2019)

References 

Agriculture and Agri-Food Canada
Living people
Year of birth missing (living people)
20th-century Canadian women scientists
University of Manitoba alumni
Canadian soil scientists
21st-century Canadian women scientists